Sir Jamsetjee Jeejebhoy, 3rd Baronet, (3 March 1851 – 16 July 1898) was an Indian businessman.

Born Menekjee Cursatjee, he was the eldest son of Sir Jamsetjee Jeejebhoy, the second baronet.  Jeejebhoy inherited the baronetcy from his father in 1877.

Jeejebhoy enjoyed the advantages of an English education, and continued the career of benevolent activity and loyalty to British rule which had been the theme of his father and grandfather's life. His public service was recognised by his nomination to the Order of the Star of India, as well as by appointment to the Legislative Councils of Calcutta and Bombay. In 1881, he visited King Kalākaua of Hawaii on the monarch's world tour, while he was in Bombay.

On his death, his title was inherited by his younger brother, Cowsajee.

References

1851 births
1898 deaths
Parsi people from Mumbai
Baronets in the Baronetage of the United Kingdom
Indian baronets
Companions of the Order of the Star of India
Members of the Bombay Legislative Council
Businesspeople from Mumbai